Pay Chen (born August 12, 1976) is a Canadian television host, currently based in Toronto, Ontario, Canada.

Chen grew up in Halifax and Beaver Bank, Nova Scotia. She moved to Toronto to attend Ryerson University, later working in writing and production roles for television series produced by Treehouse TV, YTV, and TVOntario. She then switched to Toronto's OMNI Television, where she worked for seven years producing and hosting paid informational and lifestyle segments, as well as a series of fact segments.

In 2009, she joined Citytv Winnipeg, where she co-hosted Breakfast Television Winnipeg. Starting alongside Jon Ljungberg, she replaced Heather Steele, who moved elsewhere on the station. She also wrote a food column for Metro Winnipeg. Upon leaving Breakfast in late 2011, she moved back to Toronto, where she can now be found hosting her own radio show on Newstalk 1010. Chen also appears on Breakfast Television Toronto.

Her brother is a member of the Royal Canadian Mounted Police.

Filmography
 Host, bio blast programming block (Biography Channel Canada)
 Poetry segment, 4 Square
 GNN News Anchor, Dark Matter
 Hi Opie!

References

External links
 Official Website
 Citytv Winnipeg: Pay Chen
 

Canadian television hosts
Living people
Canadian people of Taiwanese descent
1976 births